Miskeen Emmanuel is a South Sudanese footballer who currently plays as a defender.

International career
He made three senior appearances for South Sudan against Ethiopia, Kenya and Uganda in the 2012 CECAFA Cup. He received a yellow card against Uganda.

References

Living people
South Sudanese footballers
South Sudan international footballers
Association football defenders
Year of birth missing (living people)